Antiguoko Kirol Elkartea (Sport Club of Antiguo in English) is an amateur youth Spanish football club based in Antiguo, a part of San Sebastián, in the Basque Country, Spain.

It acts as feeder club to Athletic Bilbao, having previously had the same agreement with Real Sociedad.

Club overview
Antiguoko was founded in 1982, at which time the team did not even possess its own ground.

A number of famous players who appeared for Real Sociedad as well as other teams – and the Spanish national side – have graduated from the club, including Xabi Alonso, Mikel Arteta, Javier de Pedro and Yuri Berchiche. Sell-on fees from multi-million transfers involving Alonso and Arteta have provided funds for Antiguoko to improve their facilities.

Aritz Aduriz, Andoni Iraola and Ander Murillo were also youth products of Antiguoko, and went on to later appear professionally with Real Sociedad's Basque neighbours Athletic Bilbao, a club which had a formal agreement with Antiguoko for several seasons and continues to acquire its players on a regular basis.

The Juvenil A squad play in the Group II of the División de Honor Juvenil de Fútbol. The opponents in the league group include the academy teams of Athletic Bilbao, Real Sociedad and Osasuna, other clubs whose adult departments compete at various levels from La Liga down to Tercera División, and another strong youth-only organisation, Danok Bat. The Juvenil B team plays in the Liga Nacional Juvenil de Fútbol which is the lower division of the same structure, and the Juvenil C team participates in the Liga Vasca one tier further down - as with adult leagues, the different teams cannot coincide at the same level.

Antiguoko finished top of the league in 2006-07 which gave them a rare chance to compete nationally in the Copa de Campeones Juvenil and the Copa del Rey Juvenil.

Season to season (Juvenil A)

División de Honor Juvenil
Seasons with two or more trophies shown in bold

See also
:Category:Antiguoko players

References

External links
Official website 

Football clubs in the Basque Country (autonomous community)
Sports teams in San Sebastián
Association football clubs established in 1982
1982 establishments in Spain
División de Honor Juvenil de Fútbol